Clarkdale Historic District may refer to:

Clarkdale Historic District (Arizona), listed on the NRHP in Arizona
Clarkdale Historic District (Georgia), listed on the NRHP in Georgia